Jacob Winings House and Clover Mill is a historic clover mill and home located in Warwick Township, Chester County, Pennsylvania.  The house was built by 1796, and is a -story, random fieldstone structure, six bays wide by two bays deep. It has a gable roof and a porch added in the late 19th century.  The mill is a small, -story, banked stone structure with a gable roof.

It was added to the National Register of Historic Places in 1979.

References

Houses on the National Register of Historic Places in Pennsylvania
Houses completed in 1796
Houses in Chester County, Pennsylvania
National Register of Historic Places in Chester County, Pennsylvania
1796 establishments in Pennsylvania